Gonder is a village in Karnal district, Haryana, India  with approximately 30000 population.
It's a historical village as It's named for Gautam Rishi. The Chauhan clan from Rajput dynasty 12000 population . Brahmin voters are also dominated in this village with others caste 18000 population, Rajput is the main caste of village.ACP kuldeep panchal (Haryana police)  is also from this village  

The main occupation is Kheti (Agriculture).

Villages in Karnal district